Frederick Dozier Gardner (November 6, 1869December 18, 1933), an American businessman and politician from St. Louis, Missouri, served as the 34th Governor of Missouri from 1917 to 1921.

Political career
Gardner was born in Hickman, Kentucky; his father was William H. Gardner.  He rose to prominence in St. Louis. The only political office he ever sought was a single term as governor, and he narrowly won the election of 1916. However, he did later attend national conventions of the Democratic Party.

As Governor of Missouri he oversaw the elimination of the state's debt; it was $2,250,000 when he took office, but the state had over $3,500,000 in the treasury at the end of his term.

Businessman
In addition to his political career, Gardner spent 47 years in the funeral industry both as a funeral director and supplier, starting his career as an office boy.  He worked for the Ellis Undertaking Co., M. Hermann & Son Livery & Undertaking, and the Southern Undertaking Co., all located in St. Louis.  He eventually owned the St. Louis Coffin Co., and served as its president.  He was also vice president of Gardner Motor Co. which operated in St. Louis from 1920 to 1932 and manufactured hearses and ambulances. He also operated casket manufacturing plants in Memphis, Tennessee; Texarkana, Arkansas; and Dallas, Texas.

Personal life and death
He married Jeannette Vosburgh in 1894 and they had four children: William King, Dozier, Lee, and Janet Gardner. He was also a Freemason belonging to the historic Tuscan Lodge #360 Masonic Temple. He died December 18, 1933 in St. Louis, from an infection of the jaw.  He was buried in the Bellefontaine Cemetery there with full Masonic rites.

References

External links

 Gardner Motor Cars
 

1869 births
1933 deaths
American funeral directors
Democratic Party governors of Missouri
Funeral transport
Burials at Bellefontaine Cemetery
People from Fulton County, Kentucky